Enallagma antennatum, the rainbow bluet, is a species of narrow-winged damselfly in the family Coenagrionidae. It is found in eastern and central North America.

The IUCN conservation status of Enallagma antennatum is "LC", least concern, with no immediate threat to the species' survival. The population is stable. The IUCN status was reviewed in 2017.

References

Further reading

 

Coenagrionidae
Odonata of North America
Insects described in 1839
Taxa named by Thomas Say
Articles created by Qbugbot